Karin Ertl, née Specht (born 23 June 1974 in Immenstadt, Bavaria) is a German heptathlete.

Achievements

External links

1974 births
Living people
People from Immenstadt
Sportspeople from Swabia (Bavaria)
German heptathletes
Athletes (track and field) at the 2000 Summer Olympics
Athletes (track and field) at the 2004 Summer Olympics
Olympic athletes of Germany